Betawi may refer to:

Betawi people
Betawi language
Betawi cuisine
Betawi mask dance

See also
 Bedawi (disambiguation)
 Batavi (disambiguation)

Language and nationality disambiguation pages